WAJD (1390 AM) is a commercial radio station in Gainesville, Florida. It is owned by Gillen Broadcasting Corporation and airs an urban contemporary format. In Gainesville and adjacent communities, programming can also be heard on FM translator W255CV at 98.9 MHz.  WAJD calls itself "98.9 Jamz" using the frequency of the FM translator.

The studios and offices are on SW 24th Avenue in Gainesville.  WAJD's transmitter is off NE 16th Avenue.

History
WPUP signed on May 31, 1962, as a country music outlet. The station was sold the next year to WUWU Radio, Inc.; the new owners changed the callsign to WUWU, adopting the "Woo-Woo" name but retaining the country format.

WUWU was sold to Olivia Broadcasting in 1971. Olivia relaunched the station as WAKA and flipped its format to beautiful music, adopting the slogan "AM 1390, The Only One To Turn To." After an experiment with a Top 40/oldies hybrid format in 1973, the station returned to beautiful music the next year. In 1978, Nabco, Inc. acquired WAKA and moved it toward a middle-of-the-road (MOR) format as "14K". This was replaced with a Top 40/New Wave format in 1980.

WAKA became adult contemporary WKGR under new owners, Kent Gainesville Radio, in 1981. When Kent sold the station to the Sunshine Wireless Company, owners of WYKS FM, it was relaunched as WMGI "Magic 1390" with a Jazz/Urban Contemporary format. In 1986, 1390 returned to country when the WDVH call letters and format were moved to 980 kHz (which became WLUS).
1390 was sold to the current owner, Gillen Broadcasting, along with WYKS, for $1.9 million in 1987. After one last change to WAJD, the station debuted a top 40 format only to flip formats again that same year to all-news "Newsradio 1390". The station made yet another change to heavy metal in 1988 before becoming a full simulcast of WYKS in 1990.

In November 2000, the station flipped to Radio Disney, going silent on July 7, 2009. When it returned in 2010, it did so with an urban oldies format, which lasted three years before changing to talk. After more silence in 2014–15, the station returned to the air; in 2016, it changed formats to smooth jazz, and in October 2019, WAJD flipped formats to R&B/Hip-Hop as "99 Jamz".

Previous logo

References
WAJD's page on CFL Radio

External links
smooth jazz 98.9 facebook
Central Florida Radio

AJD
Radio stations established in 1962
Urban contemporary radio stations in the United States
1962 establishments in Florida